The Type 63 AT mine is a large circular Japanese minimum metal anti-tank blast mine. The mine does not float and is waterproof, enabling it to be used in shallow water. The mine uses a standard mechanical pressure fuze, with three ball bearings retaining a spring-loaded striker over a detonator assembly. The Type 63B variant has a secondary fuze well to attach an anti-handling device.

Specifications
 Diameter: 305 mm
 Height: 216 mm
 Weight: 14.5 kg
 Explosive content: 11 kg of Composition B
 Operating pressure: 181 kg

References

 Jane's Mines and Mine Clearance 2005-2006

Anti-tank mines
Land mines of Japan